The Danish Census Book or the Danish book of land taxation  dates from the 13th century and consists of a number of separate manuscripts. The original manuscripts are now housed in the Danish National Archives (Rigsarkivet) in Copenhagen.

History
The land registration  was commissioned during the reign of King Valdemar II of Denmark (1202–1241).
The registry contains notes for practical use in the Royal Chancery of the Kingdom of Denmark. It consists of a collection of information regarding Royal income and properties. The book is one of the most important sources of information in regard to social conditions and place names during the Middle Ages.  Many locations in Denmark, northern Germany, southern Sweden and northern Estonia were recorded in writing for the first time.

See also
Codex Holmiensis
History of Denmark

References

Further reading
Jespersen, Knud J. V. (2011) A History of Denmark (Palgrave Macmillan) 
Lauring, Palle (1986) A History of Denmark (Nordic Academic Press)
Murray, Alan V. (2009) The Clash of Cultures on the Medieval Baltic Frontier (Ashgate Publishing, Ltd.) 
Thunberg, Carl L. (2012). Att tolka Svitjod [To interpret Svitjod]. (Göteborgs universitet. CLTS) .

External links 
Nielsen, Oluf (red.) (1873)  Liber Census Daniæ. Kong Valdemar den Andens Jordebog (Copenhagen: Gads Forlag)

Danish chronicles
Law books
13th-century manuscripts
13th-century books